Hemarthria altissima, variously called limpo grass, limpograss, halt grass, Batavian quick grass, swamp couch grass, red swamp grass and red vleigrass, is a species of flowering plant in the jointgrass genus Hemarthria, family Poaceae. It is native to the Old World Tropics and Subtropics; Africa, Southern Europe, the Middle East, India, Southeast Asia, eastern China, and Borneo, and widely introduced as a forage in the New World, from Texas and Florida south to northern Argentina. In addition to being a valued forage for livestock, it makes a good, fragrant silage. A number of cultivars are commercially available.

References

Andropogoneae
Flora of Africa
Flora of the Western Indian Ocean
Flora of Spain
Flora of the Balearic Islands
Flora of Italy
Flora of Sicily
Flora of Greece
Flora of Crete
Flora of the East Aegean Islands
Flora of Turkey
Flora of the Transcaucasus
Flora of Syria
Flora of Lebanon
Flora of Palestine (region)
Flora of Saudi Arabia
Flora of India (region)
Flora of West Himalaya
Flora of Indo-China
Flora of Southeast China
Flora of South-Central China
Flora of North-Central China
Flora of Manchuria
Flora of Borneo
Plants described in 1934